Open water swimming competition at the 2016 Asian Beach Games was held in Danang, Vietnam on 23 and 25 September 2016 at the Bien Dong Park, Danang.

Medalists

Men

Women

Medal table

Results

Men

5 km
25 September

10 km
23 September

Women

5 km
23 September

10 km
25 September

References

External links 
 
 Official Result Book – Marathon Swimming

2016 Asian Beach Games events
Asian Beach Games
2016